Tommy O'Hagan (born 5 October 1993) is an Irish former rugby union player, who last played for Pro14 and European Rugby Champions Cup side Ulster in the 2018-19 season. He played as a prop.

Ulster
O'Hagan made his senior Ulster debut on 28 December 2018 in round 12 of the 2018–19 Pro14, featuring off the bench in the provinces 37–17 win against Scottish side Glasgow Warriors. He was released ahead of the 2020-21 season.

References

External links
Ulster Profile
Pro14 Profile

1993 births
Living people
Rugby union players from County Antrim
Irish rugby union players
Ulster Rugby players
Rugby union props
People from Ballymoney